Drynoch  is a settlement on the south east tip of Loch Harport on the west coast of Skye in the Highlands of Scotland. It is in the Scottish council area of Highland.

The River Drynoch runs through the village, flowing down from Glen Drynoch into the loch.

References

Populated places in the Isle of Skye